Buhigwe District is one of the eight districts of the Kigoma Region of Tanzania. It is one of the 20 new districts that were formed in Tanzania since 2010; it was split off from Kasulu Rural District. Buhigwe District is bordered to the north by Burundi, to the east by Kasulu Rural District and Kasulu Urban District, and to the west by Kigoma Rural District. Its administrative seat is the town of Buhigwe.

According to the 2012 Tanzania National Census, the population of Buhigwe District was 254,342.

Transport

Road Network
The paved trunk road T19 from Kigoma to the Burundi border passes through a small portion of the district.

Buhigwe District is a junction that link roads to Kigoma, Kasulu District, and Republic of Burundi. Generally, main regional roads and truck roads are passable throughout the year but feeder roads and District roads are traversed with difficulty during rain season.

Air Transport
Buhigwe has one airstrips located at Biharu. This airstrip is mainly used and maintained by missionaries’ freight.

Administrative subdivisions
As of 2012, Buhigwe District was administratively divided into 20 wards.

Wards

 Biharu
 Buhigwe (Buhigwe DC)
 Janda (Buhigwe DC)
 Kajana (Buhigwe DC)
 Kibande
 Kilelema
 Mugera
 Muhinda
 Munanila
 Munyegera
 Munzeze
 Muyama
 Mwayaya
 Nyamugali
 Rusaba

Geography
Buhigwe natural  geographical  position  is  characterized  by  topography,  soil  fertility,  favorable climatic  conditions  and  reliable  infrastructures  and  soon  the  District  will  be  electrified  by thermal power that will make Buhigwe best option for investors. The  District  council  is  proud  of  production  in  maize,  beans,  banana  and  cassava  for  food crops  while  coffee,  oil palm  and  ginger  is  considered  to  be  cash  crop  and opportunity  of establishing  sugar cane  plantation  along  Malagarasi River.  The topographical and favorable conditions found in  Buhigwe  may attract tourism activities.  The area is characterized by attractive landscapes such as gullies and a number of valleys.

Economy

Agriculture
Agriculture is the main income-generating activity in the District. Over 85% of the inhabitants depend on crop and animal husbandry. Out of that, only 50% of the land is actually cultivated, therefore there is a wide room for expansion.

The major farming mechanism in Buhigwe District is based on coffee, maize, bean, banana system in the highlands, maize-tobacco in the low lands and sugar cane and paddy along the river and water streams. Cash crops include Coffee, palm, Cotton, Tobacco, Ginger and Sugar cane while Maize, Cassava, Beans, Banana, Paddy are food crops. Coffee is the major source of income in the highlands and rolling hills area while maize and tobacco are the major sources of income in the lowland areas.

Farming activities are being conducted by using traditional implements such as hand hoes and it is family labor-based which results in low yield per area thus a need to invest in this sector

Livestock Production

Livestock keeping practiced in Buhigwe District is both traditional and commercial in nature. A large proportion of cattle, goats and sheep are indigenous dominated by pastoralists and agro-pastoralists. The District has about 29,665 cattle, 17,506 goats, 3,893 sheep, 852 pigs, 123,517 chicken and 9,220 ducks. The District is rich of cattle population due favorable weather condition as compared to other District in Kigoma Region. The District is on serious planning in controlling tsetse fly in cooperation with other stakeholder within and outside the District. However, the number and quality of the livestock kept has remained low compared to the high population growth of the District and demand.

References

 
Districts of Kigoma Region